Chrysoritis nigricans, the dark opal, is a butterfly of the family Lycaenidae found only in South Africa.

The wingspan is 22–33 mm for males and 23–38 mm for females. Flight period is multi-brooded from September to April, peaking October/November and March.

Larvae feed on Thesium species, Osteospermum polygaloides, and Zygophyllum species. They are associated with ants of the genus Crematogaster.

Subspecies
Chrysoritis nigricans nigricans (South Africa: Western Cape province)
Chrysoritis nigricans zwartbergae (Dickson, 1982) (South Africa: Western Cape province)
Chrysoritis nigricans rubrescens Heath & Pringle, 2007 (South Africa: Western Cape province)

References

nigricans
Endemic butterflies of South Africa
Butterflies described in 1924
Taxa named by Per Olof Christopher Aurivillius